Langlands Park busway station is located in Brisbane, Australia serving the suburbs of Stones Corner and Coorparoo. It opened on 29 August 2011, as part of the Eastern Busway from Buranda to Main Avenue, Coorparoo.

It is served by three routes all operated by Brisbane Transport. Buses enter the station from bus lanes on Old Cleveland Road and from Main Avenue.

It is currently the easternmost station on the Eastern Busway. It is proposed to extend the busway along Old Cleveland Road to Capalaba.

References

External links
[ Langlands Park station] TransLink

Bus stations in Brisbane
Coorparoo, Queensland
Transport infrastructure completed in 2011